The Thác Bà Lake is a manmade lake in Yên Bái Province, Vietnam created by construction of the Thác Bà hydroelectric plant in the 1960s. Thác Bà is the name of the Bà Falls which pre-existed the dam (cf. Vietnamese: thác nước, waterfall).

References

Lakes of Vietnam